"Roc Ya Body (Mic Check 1 2)" is the debut single of American hip hop group MVP featuring rapper Stagga Lee. Released on June 20, 2005, the single peaked at number five on the UK Singles Chart, number six on the Irish Singles Chart, number 15 on the Dutch Single Top 100, and number 82 on the US Billboard Hot 100. The group released a follow-up single called "Bounce, Shake, Move, Stop!" in the United Kingdom the following year.

Music video
In the music video, the main singer opens a gate to reveal many scantily clad dancers who then dance around the group.

Track listings

Australian CD single
 "Roc Ya Body 'Mic Check 1,2'" (The M.V.P. radio edit)
 "Roc Ya Body 'Mic Check 1,2'" (The M.V.P. club mix)
 "Roc Ya Body 'Mic Check 1,2'" (Robi-Rob's Roc da Jeep vocal mix)
 "Roc Ya Body 'Mic Check 1,2'" (Robi-Rob's Boriqua Anthem vocal mix)
 "Roc Ya Body 'Mic Check 1,2'" (DJ Zinc vocal mix)
 "Roc Ya Body 'Mic Check 1,2'" (Jupiter Ace vocal mix)

UK 12-inch single
A1. "Roc Ya Body 'Mic Check 1,2'" (The MVP club mix)
A2. "Roc Ya Body 'Mic Check 1,2'" (Jupiter Ace vocal mix)
B1. "Roc Ya Body 'Mic Check 1,2'" (DJ Zinc vocal mix)
B2. "Roc Ya Body 'Mic Check 1,2'" (Robi-Rob's Boriqua Anthem vocal mix)

UK CD1
 "Roc Ya Body 'Mic Check 1,2'" (The MVP radio edit)
 "Roc Ya Body 'Mic Check 1,2'" (The MVP club mix)
 "Roc Ya Body 'Mic Check 1,2'" (Robi-Rob's Roc da Jeep vocal mix)
 "Roc Ya Body 'Mic Check 1,2'" (Robi-Rob's Boriqua Anthem vocal mix)
 "Roc Ya Body 'Mic Check 1,2'" (DJ Zinc vocal mix)
 "Roc Ya Body 'Mic Check 1,2'" (Jupiter Ace vocal mix)
 "Roc Ya Body 'Mic Check 1,2'" (enhanced video)

UK CD2 and European CD single
 "Roc Ya Body 'Mic Check 1,2'" (The MVP radio edit)
 Stagga Lee presents MVP – "Hip Hop (Is What I Am)"

Charts

Weekly charts

Year-end charts

Certifications

Release history

References

External links
 Official YouTube music video

2005 debut singles
Positiva Records singles
Song recordings produced by Robert Clivillés
Songs written by Robert Clivillés